Hülsen is a German surname. Notable people with the surname include:
August Ludwig Hülsen (1765-1809), philosopher
Dietrich von Hülsen-Haeseler (1852-1908), general
Christian Hülsen (1858-1935), historian
Bernhard von Hülsen (1865-1950), general
Hans von Hülsen (1890–1969), writer
Johann Dietrich von Hülsen, (1693–1767), Prussian general during the Seven Years' War

German-language surnames